James Tien is the name of:

James Tien (actor) (born 1942), Hong Kong actor from Guangdong
James Tien (politician) (born 1947), Hong Kong politician, former Liberal Party chairman and Legislative Council member
James M. Tien, American engineering professor, University of Miami College of Engineering